J. T. Battenberg III (born 1944) was the chairman, CEO, and President of Delphi Corporation from 1998 to 2005.

Early life and career
Battenberg obtained a Bachelor of Science from Kettering University in 1966 and a Master of Business Administration from Columbia Business School in 1969. He joined General Motors in 1961, working his way up the company.  He eventually took over management of Delphi, a GM spinoff.

References

Columbia Business School alumni
Kettering University alumni
Living people
1944 births
American chief executives in the automobile industry
American chief executives of manufacturing companies
20th-century American businesspeople